The Black Forest Clinic is a German medical drama television series that was produced by and filmed in West Germany. The series was produced between 1984 and 1988 with the original airing being from October 2, 1985 to March 25, 1989 on West Germany's ZDF (Zweites Deutsches Fernsehen) television channel.

The series' storyline follows the inner workings of a small fictional hospital in the Black Forest region of Germany as well as the lives of the Brinkmann family of doctors who work at the hospital.

Shortly after broadcasting had begun in 1985, The Black Forest Clinic became a highly popular television event, reaching audiences of over 20 million viewers. 25 years since its debut, it is still highly regarded in Germany. The series had been re-broadcast several times since 1985 and has spawned two television films released 20 years after its initial airing.

Background and development
The creation of The Black Forest Clinic was influenced by the popularity of the Czechoslovak medical drama series Hospital at the End of the City which originally aired from 1977 to 1981 and was broadcast in both East Germany and West Germany. Actor Klausjürgen Wussow in interviews cited long-running American daytime television drama General Hospital as a major influence on The Black Forest Clinic.

The setting for the fictional hospital was the real-life Glotterbad Clinic in the town of Glottertal located in the Black Forest of Baden-Württemberg. Only the exterior of the Glotterbad Clinic was photographed and shown in the series, the filming of action inside the hospital was done in a studio in Hamburg. The name for the fictional hospital was borrowed from the location as well — Schwarzwald being the German language name of Black Forest.

The idea for The Black Forest Clinic was conceived by Herbert Lichtenfeld who also wrote the teleplay. The producer of the series was Wolfgang Rademann who had, at that time, been known in Germany as the producer of the German version of The Love Boat. Rademann had for several years attempted to pitch to television networks the idea for a medical television series but with little success due to a lack of interest by the networks.

Principal photography for the series began in the summer of 1984 in Glottertal. Polyphon Film-und Fernsehgesellschaft production company was producing the series for both ZDF and Austrian broadcaster Österreichischer Rundfunk (ORF).

Reception and viewership
The Black Forest Clinic quickly achieved a high level of popularity among its viewers. From the series' debut until 2009, the broadcast of the series had been repeated in Germany seven times in its entirety and the series had also been broadcast in 38 countries. On its official website dedicated to The Black Forest Clinic, ZDF has called the series "the first and most popular German medical drama". In 2008 Süddeutsche Zeitung, Germany's largest circulation daily newspaper, has proclaimed The Black Forest Clinic "the epitome of German television bliss". The Black Forest Clinic is estimated to have had over 20 million regular viewers. The popularity of the series also spawned two television films that were released in 2005 in time for the series' 20th anniversary.

Cast and characters

 Klausjürgen Wussow — Klaus Brinkmann 
 Gaby Dohm — Christa Brinkmann
 Sascha Hehn — Udo Brinkmann 
  — Elke 
 Evelyn Hamann — Carsta Michaelis 
  — Mischa 
  — Hildegard
 Alf Marholm — Mühlmann
  — Ina
  — Mrs Meis
 Horst Naumann — Dr. Römer

List of episodes

List of The Black Forest Clinic episodes

References

External links

 

1985 German television series debuts
1989 German television series endings
German drama television series
German medical television series
Serial drama television series
ZDF original programming
German-language television shows